Sungai Puar (Dutch: Soengei Poear or Soengai Poear)  is a town in Agam Regency, West Sumatra province, Indonesia. Writer Abdoel Moeis was born there. Sungai Puar is known for its antiques.

Gallery

References

Districts of West Sumatra
Populated places in West Sumatra